Dewey Avenue–West Rosine Historic District is a national historic district located at St. Joseph, Missouri. The district encompasses 37 contributing buildings and 1 contributing site in a predominantly residential section of St. Joseph. It developed between about 1880 and 1930, and includes representative examples of Italianate, Second Empire, Queen Anne, Colonial Revival, Tudor Revival, and American Craftsman style architecture. Notable buildings include the Marshall B. Stroud House (1890), John and Frank Whitman House (1890), Johanna Johnson House (1908), Frank Lacy House (1900), and a number of speculative houses built by Charles H. Nowland.

It was listed on the National Register of Historic Places in 2002.

References

Historic districts on the National Register of Historic Places in Missouri
Italianate architecture in Missouri
Second Empire architecture in Missouri
Queen Anne architecture in Missouri
Colonial Revival architecture in Missouri
Tudor Revival architecture in Missouri
Historic districts in St. Joseph, Missouri
National Register of Historic Places in Buchanan County, Missouri